Coldplay are a British rock band formed in London in 1997. They consist of vocalist and pianist Chris Martin, guitarist Jonny Buckland, bassist Guy Berryman, drummer Will Champion and creative director Phil Harvey. They met at University College London and began playing music together from 1996 to 1998, initially calling themselves Starfish.

After independently releasing an extended play, Safety (1998), Coldplay signed with Parlophone in 1999. The band's debut album, Parachutes (2000), included their breakthrough single "Yellow" and received a Brit Award for British Album of the Year, a Grammy Award for Best Alternative Music Album and a Mercury Prize nomination. Their second album, A Rush of Blood to the Head (2002), won the same accolades and included the single "Clocks", which won a Grammy Award for Record of the Year. The band's third album, X&Y (2005), which completed what the band considered to be a trilogy, and their fourth album, Viva la Vida or Death and All His Friends (2008), were both nominated for a Grammy Award for Best Rock Album, with the latter winning; both albums were the best-selling of their respective years, topping the charts in over 30 countries. Viva la Vida was also nominated for Album of the Year, while its title track became the first single by a British group to simultaneously reach number one in the United Kingdom and United States in the 21st century.

Coldplay further diversified their sound over their next five studio albums, the most recent being Music of the Spheres (2021). Each album presented a unique theme and added new musical styles to the band's original repertoire, including electronica, ambient, pop, R&B, classical and progressive rock. They are also known for "euphoric" and "immersive" live performances, which NME said are when the band "come alive and make the most sense". In 2018, a career-spanning documentary directed by Mat Whitecross was released in select cinemas to mark the band's 20th anniversary.

With 100 million albums sold worldwide, Coldplay are one of the best-selling music acts of all time. According to Fuse, they are the sixth-most awarded group in history, which includes the most Brit Award nominations and wins for a band. Other notable achievements include the seventh-highest-grossing tour of all time, three of the 50 highest-selling albums in the United Kingdom, the most number-one albums in the country without ever missing the top, and becoming the first British group to debut at number one on the Billboard Hot 100. Coldplay are considered one of the most influential bands of the 21st century, with Forbes describing them as the standard for the current alternative music scene. The Rock and Roll Hall of Fame included A Rush of Blood to the Head on their "200 Definitive Albums" list and the single "Yellow" is part of their "Songs That Shaped Rock and Roll" exhibition for being one of the most successful and important recordings in the music industry. Despite their popularity and impact, Coldplay have earned a reputation as polarizing music icons.

History

1996–1999: Formation and first years

Chris Martin and Jonny Buckland first met during their orientation week at University College London, in September 1996. The pair began to write their first songs together in early 1997 and practised every night. Guy Berryman was the third member to join the band in the following months and they recorded various demos without a drummer, calling themselves Big Fat Noises by November. In 1998, Will Champion completed the line-up. He explained that Martin, Buckland and Berryman had come to his house because a roommate had a drum kit and was a good drummer, but he had not turned up, "so I just said I would give it a go".

Champion scheduled the band's first live performance only a few days after becoming part it. They had not chosen a proper name yet and called themselves Starfish for the show, which was held on 16 January 1998 at The Laurel Tree, in Camden. Weeks later, the name Coldplay was settled. In May 1998, the band released Safety, an independent EP financed by Martin's lifelong friend, Phil Harvey. Out of 500 copies pressed, 150 went to open market. Harvey sold the first one to his roommate for £3 and the rest were given away to record labels.

As Martin complained about the "vice-like grip" one of the Camden promoters had on the band, Harvey suggested the group should book their own concert at Dingwalls, where they managed to sell 50 copies of Safety. The event is considered when Harvey began to manage Coldplay and he later dropped out of his Classical Studies degree at Trinity College, Oxford to work. More concerts were scheduled throughout the summer, including two with Keane. Martin once invited Tim Rice-Oxley to be Coldplay's keyboard player, but "when we discussed it again a couple of weeks later, he said that the rest of the band weren't keen on adding a member". In September 1998, they were part of Manchester's In the City showcase and got discovered by A&R scout Debs Wild. Safety was then followed by a cassette demo with "Ode to Deodorant" and "Brothers & Sisters".

Wild informed BMG Publishing's Caroline Elleray and music lawyer Gavin Maude about the band. The former talked to Dan Keeling at Parlophone but he had already passed on them. Meanwhile, the latter talked to Simon Williams from Fierce Panda Records, who in turn told BBC Radio's Steve Lamacq. On 3 January 1999, Coldplay became the first unsigned act to guest on Lamacq's Evening Session. A month later, they made a short deal with Fierce Panda and re-recorded "Brothers & Sisters". Six other labels offered a contract as the band's popularity grew, but they wanted Parlophone, which led Elleray to contact Keeling once again. He changed his mind and the deal was signed at Trafalgar Square in April 1999, the same month in which "Brothers & Sisters" was released as a single. The next days saw them study for UCL's final examinations.

On 27 June 1999, Coldplay made their first appearance at the Glastonbury Festival in the New Bands Tent. They later recorded The Blue Room, which had 5,000 copies pressed and sold to the public. Its sessions were originally meant for Parachutes (2000) but ended up becoming tumultuous, as Martin and Champion had heated discussions regarding the latter's abilities as a drummer: "Three days later, the rest of us were feeling miserable, [...] we asked him to come back. They made me have lots of vodka and cranberry juice in remembrance of what a nasty piece of work I was being". After working out their differences, the band started to work as a democracy, put in place a new set of rules and declared that anyone using hard drugs would be kicked out of the group immediately, a decision inspired by acts such as R.E.M. and U2.

2000–2001: Parachutes

The band first planned to record their debut album, Parachutes, over the span of two weeks. However, due to tours and other live performances, the recording took place between September 1999 and April–May 2000. The album was recorded at Rockfield Studios, Matrix Studios, and Wessex Sound Studios with producer Ken Nelson, although the majority of Parachutes tracks were recorded at Liverpool's Parr Street Studios (where they used three studio rooms). American engineer Michael Brauer in New York mixed all of the songs for the album. During that time they played on the Carling Tour, which showcased up-and-coming acts.

After releasing two EPs without a hit song, Coldplay had their first Top 40 hit with the lead single from Parachutes, "Shiver", which was released in March 2000, the same week Coldplay played The Forum in Tunbridge Wells supporting the band Terris as part of the NME Premier Tour. "Shiver" peaked at the number 35 position on the UK Singles Chart. June 2000 was a pivotal moment in Coldplay's history: the band embarked on their first headlining tour, including a performance at the Glastonbury Festival. The band also released the single "Yellow"; it was Coldplay's first release to reach the top five and rose to number four on the UK Singles Chart. The minimalistic music video for "Yellow" was filmed at Studland Bay in Dorset, and featured Martin singing the song in one continuous shot as he walked along the beach. "Yellow" and "Shiver" were initially released as EPs in the spring of 2000. The former was released as a single in the United Kingdom on 26 June 2000. In the United States, the song was released as the lead single from the then-untitled debut album. In October 2000, the track was sent to US college and alternative radio outlets.

Coldplay released Parachutes on 10 July 2000 in the United Kingdom via their record label, Parlophone. The album debuted at number one on the UK Albums Chart. It was released on 7 November 2000 by record label Nettwerk in North America. The album has been made available on various formats since its initial release; both Parlophone and Nettwerk released it as a CD in 2000, and it was also released as a Cassette by US label Capitol in 2001. In the following year, Parlophone issued the album as an LP. Four singles were released from Parachutes, including "Shiver" and "Yellow", and enjoyed popularity in the UK and US. The third single was "Trouble", which reached number 10 in the UK charts. It was released more than a year later in the US, and reached number 28 in the Alternative Songs chart. In December 2001, the band released a limited-edition CD, Mince Spies, featuring a remix of "Yellow" and the Christmas song "Have Yourself a Merry Little Christmas". It was pressed to 1,000 copies, and was issued only to fans and journalists.

Parachutes was nominated for the Mercury Music Prize in September 2000. Having found success in Europe, the band set their sights on North America, by releasing the album there in November 2000, and started the US Club Tour in February 2001. At the 2001 Brit Awards in February, Coldplay earned awards for Best British Group, and Best British Album. Although Parachutes was a slow-burning success in the United States, it eventually reached double-platinum status. The album was critically well received and earned a Best Alternative Music Album honours at the 2002 Grammy Awards. Chris Martin said after Parachutes was released that the album's success was meant to elevate the band's status to the "biggest, best band in the world". After single-handedly managing the band until early 2001, Harvey resigned due to the stress of having to perform duties that typically require a team of people. He became the group's creative director and is often referenced as their fifth member; Dave Holmes replaced him as manager.

2002–2004: A Rush of Blood to the Head

After the success of Parachutes, Coldplay returned to the studio in September 2001 to begin work on their second album, A Rush of Blood to the Head, once again with Ken Nelson producing. They had trouble focusing in London and decided to relocate to Liverpool, where they recorded some of the songs on Parachutes. Once there, vocalist Chris Martin said that they became obsessed with recording. "In My Place" was the first song recorded for the album. The band released it as the album's lead single because it was the track that made them want to record a second album, following a "strange period of not really knowing what we were doing" three months after the success of Parachutes. According to Martin "one thing kept us going: recording 'In My Place'. Then other songs started coming."

The band wrote more than 20 songs for the album. Some of their new material, including "In My Place" and "Animals", was played live while the band were still touring Parachutes. The album's title was revealed through a post on the band's official website. The album was released in August 2002 and spawned several popular singles, including "In My Place", "Clocks", and the ballad "The Scientist". The latter was inspired by George Harrison's "All Things Must Pass", which was released in 1970.

Coldplay toured from 19 June 2002 to 8 September 2003 for the A Rush of Blood to the Head Tour. 
They visited five continents, including co-headlining festival dates at Glastonbury Festival, V2003 and Rock Werchter. Many concerts showcased elaborate lighting and individualised screens reminiscent of U2's Elevation Tour and Nine Inch Nails' Fragility Tour. During the extended tour, Coldplay recorded a live DVD and CD, Live 2003, at Sydney's Hordern Pavilion. At the 2003 Brit Awards held at Earls Court, London, Coldplay received awards for Best British Group, and Best British Album. On 28 August 2003, Coldplay performed "The Scientist" at the 2003 MTV Video Music Awards at the Radio City Music Hall in New York City, and won three awards.

In December 2003, readers of Rolling Stone magazine chose Coldplay as the best artist and the best band of the year. At that time the band covered the Pretenders' 1983 song "2000 Miles" (which was made available for download on their official website). "2000 Miles" was the top selling UK download that year, with proceeds from the sales donated to Future Forests and Stop Handgun Violence campaigns. A Rush of Blood to the Head won the Grammy Award for Best Alternative Music Album at the 2003 Grammy Awards. At the 2004 Grammy Awards, Coldplay earned Record of the Year for "Clocks".

2005–2007: X&Y

Coldplay spent most of 2004 out of the spotlight, taking a break from touring and releasing a satire music video of a song from a fictional band titled The Nappies while recording their third album. X&Y was released in June 2005 in UK and Europe. This new, delayed release date had put the album back into the next fiscal year, and the late release was blamed for a drop in EMI's stock. It became the best-selling album of 2005 with worldwide sales of 8.3 million. The lead single, "Speed of Sound", made its radio and online music store debut on 18 April and was released as a CD on 23 May 2005. X&Y entered the album charts of 20 countries at the number one position and was the third-fastest-selling album in UK chart history.

Two other singles were released that year: "Fix You" in September and "Talk" in December. Critical reaction to X&Y was mostly positive, though slightly less enthusiastic than that of its predecessor. The New York Times critic Jon Pareles infamously described Coldplay as "the most insufferable band of the decade", whereas NME awarded the album 9/10 calling it "Confident, bold, ambitious, bunged with singles and impossible to contain, X&Y doesn't reinvent the wheel but it does reinforce Coldplay as the band of their time". Comparisons between Coldplay and U2 became commonplace. Martin said the critical review of the album by the New York Times made him feel liberated as he "agreed with a lot of the points", adding that "in a way, it was liberating to see that someone else realised that also".

From June 2005 to March 2007, Coldplay went on their Twisted Logic Tour, which included festival dates like Coachella, Isle of Wight Festival, Glastonbury and the Austin City Limits Music Festival. In July 2005, the band appeared at Live 8 in Hyde Park, where they played a rendition of the Verve's "Bitter Sweet Symphony" with Richard Ashcroft on vocals. On 28 August, Coldplay performed "Speed of Sound" at the 2005 MTV Video Music Awards in Miami. In September, Coldplay recorded a new version of "How You See the World" with reworked lyrics for War Child's Help!: A Day in the Life charity album. In February 2006, Coldplay earned Best Album and Best Single honours at the Brit Awards. Three more singles were released during 2006 and 2007, "The Hardest Part", "What If" and "White Shadows".

2008–2010: Viva la Vida or Death and All His Friends

In October 2006, Coldplay began work on their fourth studio album, Viva la Vida or Death and All His Friends, with producer Brian Eno. Taking a break from recording, the band toured Latin America in early 2007, finishing the Twisted Logic Tour while performing in Chile, Argentina, Brazil, and Mexico. After recording in churches and other venues in Latin America and Spain during their tour, the band said the album would likely reflect Hispanic influence. The group spent the rest of the year recording most of the album with Eno.

Martin described Viva la Vida as a new direction for Coldplay; a change from their past three albums, which the band felt was a "trilogy" that they had finished. He said the album featured less of his falsetto as he allowed his voice's lower register to take precedence. Some songs, such as "Violet Hill" contain distorted guitar riffs and bluesy undertones.

"Violet Hill" was confirmed as the first single, with a radio release date of 29 April 2008. After the first play, it was freely obtainable from Coldplay's website from 12:15 pm (GMT +0) for one week until it became commercially available on 6 May. "Violet Hill" entered the UK Top 10, US Top 40 and charted well in the rest of the world. The title track, "Viva la Vida", was also released exclusively on iTunes, it became the band's first number-one single on both the US Billboard Hot 100, and the UK Official Charts. Coldplay performed the song live for the first time at the 2008 MTV Movie Awards on 1 June.  "Viva la Vida" became iTunes' best-selling song of 2008.

Upon release, Viva la Vida or Death and All His Friends topped the album charts worldwide and was the world's best-selling album of 2008. It hit number one on the UK album chart despite having come on the market only three days previously. In that time, it sold 302,000 copies, being "one of the fastest-selling albums in the country's history". By the end of June, it had set a new record for most-downloaded album ever. In October 2008, Coldplay won two Q Awards for Best Album for Viva la Vida or Death and All His Friends and Best Act in the World Today. On 9 November, Coldplay were named the World's Best-selling Act of 2008 at the World Music Awards in Monte Carlo. They also picked up two other awards: World's Best-selling Rock Act and Great Britain's Best-selling Act. The band followed up Viva la Vida or Death and All His Friends with the Prospekt's March EP, which was released on 21 November 2008. The extended play features songs from the album sessions and was originally made available on its own, while the album got re-issued with all EP tracks included on a bonus disc. "Life in Technicolor II" was the only single released.

Coldplay began their Viva la Vida Tour in June with a free concert at Brixton Academy in London. This was followed two days later by a 45-minute performance that was broadcast live from outside BBC Television Centre. Released in late 2008, "Lost!" became the third single from the album, featuring a new version with Jay-Z called "Lost+". After performing the opening set on 14 March 2009 for Sound Relief at the Sydney Cricket Ground, Coldplay headlined a sold-out concert later that same night. Sound Relief is a benefit concert for victims of the Victorian Bushfire Crisis and the Queensland Floods. On 4 December 2008, Joe Satriani filed a copyright infringement suit against Coldplay in the United States District Court for the Central District of California. Satriani's suit asserted that the Coldplay song "Viva la Vida" includes "substantial original portions" of the Satriani song "If I Could Fly" from his 2004 album, Is There Love in Space?. The Coldplay song in question received two Grammy Awards for "Song of the Year". The band denied the allegation. An unspecified settlement was ultimately reached between the parties.

Coldplay were nominated for four awards at the 2009 Brit Awards: British Group, British Live Act, British Single ("Viva la Vida") and British Album (Viva la Vida or Death and All His Friends). At the 51st Grammy Awards in the same year, Coldplay won three Grammy Awards in the categories for Song of Year for "Viva la Vida", Best Rock Album for Viva la Vida or Death and All His Friends, and Best Vocal Pop Performance by a Duo or Group for "Viva la Vida". A live album titled LeftRightLeftRightLeft was recorded at various shows during the tour. LeftRightLeftRightLeft, released on 15 May 2009, was to be given away at the remaining concerts of their Viva la Vida Tour. It was released as a free download from their website. Following the Viva la Vida Tour, Coldplay announced another "Latin America tour" to take place in February and March 2010, in which they were to visit Mexico, Argentina, Brazil, and Colombia. In October 2009, Coldplay won Song of the Year for "Viva la Vida" at The American Society of Composers, Authors and Publishers (ASCAP) Awards in London. In December 2009, Rolling Stone readers voted the group the fourth best artist of the 2000s, they were also included in Q list of artists of the century. In December 2010 the band released "Christmas Lights". The song received very positive reviews, and the music video features a cameo from actor Simon Pegg, a close friend of Chris Martin, who plays a violin-playing Elvis impersonator in the background.

2011–2012: Mylo Xyloto

The band finished recording the new album in mid-2011. When Martin and Champion were interviewed by BBC Radio and asked about the album's lyrical themes, Martin replied "It's about love, addiction, OCD, escape and working for someone you don't like." When asked whether or not their fifth album would be out by the summer, Martin and Champion said that there was plenty of work to be done before releasing it. They confirmed several festival appearances before its release date, including a headlining spot at the 2011 Glastonbury Festival, T in the Park, Austin City Limits Music Festival, Rock in Rio, and Lollapalooza festival.

In an interview on 13 January 2011, Coldplay mentioned two new songs would be included on their upcoming fifth album, "Princess of China" and "Every Teardrop Is a Waterfall". In a February interview Parlophone president Miles Leonard told HitQuarters that the band were still in the studio working on the album and that he expected the final version would appear "towards the autumn of this year". On 31 May 2011, Coldplay announced that "Every Teardrop Is a Waterfall" was the first single for the fifth album. It was released on 3 June 2011. The band presented five new songs at festivals during the summer of 2011, "Charlie Brown", "Hurts Like Heaven", "Us Against the World", "Princess of China" and "Major Minus".

On 12 August 2011, Coldplay announced via their official website that Mylo Xyloto was the new album title, and that it would be released on 24 October 2011. On 12 September the band released "Paradise", the second single from their upcoming album Mylo Xyloto. On 23 September 2011, tickets for Coldplay's European tour officially went on sale. Demand proved to be very high with most venues selling out in seconds. Mylo Xyloto was released on 24 October 2011, it received mixed to positive reviews and topped the charts in over 34 countries.

On 19 October 2011, Coldplay performed songs at Apple Inc.'s private memorial for Steve Jobs, including "Viva la Vida", "Fix You", "Yellow" and "Every Teardrop Is a Waterfall". On 26 October their "Amex Unstaged" concert at the Plaza de Toros de Las Ventas in Madrid, Spain, was streamed by YouTube as a live webcast directed by Anton Corbijn. On 30 November 2011, Coldplay received three Grammy Award nominations for the 54th Annual Grammy Awards which took place on 12 February 2012 in Los Angeles, and the band performed with Rihanna at the ceremony. On 12 January 2012, Coldplay were nominated for two Brit Awards. On 21 February 2012, they were awarded the Brit Award for Best British Group for the third time. The album was the best-selling rock album in the United Kingdom, selling 908,000 copies. The album's second single, "Paradise", was also the best-selling rock single in the UK, selling 410,000 copies. At the 2012 MTV Video Music Awards, "Paradise" won the Best Rock Video award. Mylo Xyloto has sold over 8 million copies worldwide.

Coldplay headlined the closing ceremony of the London 2012 Paralympic Games on 9 September 2012, where they performed alongside other artists including Rihanna and Jay-Z. To tie in with their performance at the closing ceremony, the group gave permission for bands who were participating in the Bandstand Marathon the opportunity to perform their 2008 single "Viva la Vida" to celebrate the end of the games.

In October 2012, the music video for Coldplay's song "Hurts Like Heaven" was released. The video was based on the story of Mylo Xyloto, a boy who grew up in tyranny ran by Major Minus. The fictional comics titled Mylo Xyloto continued on the story portrayed in the music video when the series was released in early 2013. A concert documentary film and live album Coldplay Live 2012 chronicles their tour in support of the Mylo Xyloto album.  The film premiered theatrically for one night only, 13 November 2012, and was released on CD and home video on 19 November 2012.

On 21 November, after a concert in Brisbane, Australia as part on the group's Mylo Xyloto Tour, Coldplay hinted they were set to take a three-year break from touring. Coldplay performed two shows with Jay-Z in the Barclays Center, Brooklyn, New York, on 30 December and New Year's Eve which ended the Mylo Xyloto Tour. The Mylo Xyloto Tour was named the fourth-highest-grossing tour worldwide of 2012 with more than $171.3 million earned in ticket sales.

2013–2014: Ghost Stories

In an interview with Australian radio station 2Day FM, Chris Martin revealed that the title for the band's next album would be "much easier to pronounce". Martin debunked speculation that they were taking a break from touring by saying, "This three-year break idea only came about because I said at a gig in Australia that we might not be back there for three years. That's probably true, but that's just how a world tour works. No chance are we taking a three-year break."

On 9 August 2013, Coldplay announced the release of their song "Atlas", which featured on the soundtrack for the film The Hunger Games: Catching Fire. Its release got pushed back to 6 September 2013 (everywhere but the UK) and 8 September (UK). In December 2013, it was announced that future Coldplay releases would be distributed by Atlantic Records in the US due to restructuring within Warner Music Group following the purchase of Parlophone Records from EMI.

On 25 February 2014, the band unveiled "Midnight", a track from their yet-to-be released album. In early March 2014, it was announced that the band's sixth album, Ghost Stories, would be released 19 May 2014. Ghost Stories is a spiritually driven album that revolves around two major themes mentioned by Chris Martin. The album explores the idea of past actions, and the effects they can have on your future and one's capacity for unconditional love. The band took a different approach for their sixth studio album in contrast to their previous studio albums, with Martin inviting the band to contribute original songwriting material for the album, as opposed to building songs off his ideas as they had done during previous recording sessions.

From April to July, Coldplay embarked on a six-date Ghost Stories Tour in support of the album, playing 'intimate' shows in six cities: the Beacon Theatre in New York City on 5 May, Royce Hall in Los Angeles on 19 May, Casino de Paris in Paris on 28 May, Tokyo Dome City Hall in Tokyo on 12 June, Enmore Theatre in Sydney on 19 June, and closed the tour at the Royal Albert Hall in London on 2 July 2014. The album was made available for pre-order on iTunes, alongside new single "Magic". Two more singles from the album, "A Sky Full of Stars" and "True Love", have since been released. Ghost Stories received mixed to positive reviews. The album topped the charts in the UK, the US and most major markets. It received a Grammy Award nomination for Best Pop Vocal Album, and "A Sky Full of Stars" was nominated for Best Pop Duo/Group Performance. In December 2014, Spotify named Coldplay the most-streamed band in the world for 2014, and third most-streamed artist behind Ed Sheeran and Eminem.

2015–2018: A Head Full of Dreams

On 4 December 2014, Chris Martin announced in an interview with Zane Lowe on BBC Radio 1 that Coldplay were in the middle of working on their seventh studio album, A Head Full of Dreams. Martin remarked it might be the band's final album and compared it to Harry Potter: "It's our seventh thing, and the way we look at it, it's like the last Harry Potter book or something like that." He added that unlike their promotion efforts for Ghost Stories, the band will tour for the seventh record. In an interview with Jo Whiley on BBC Radio 2, Martin hinted at the style of the album by saying that the band were trying to make something colourful and uplifting, yet not bombastic. He also stated that it will be something to "shuffle your feet" to.

On 11 December 2014, the band unveiled a new song, "Miracles", which was written and recorded for the World War II drama film Unbroken directed by Angelina Jolie. At the 2015 Billboard Music Awards on 17 May, Ghost Stories was named Top Rock Album. On 26 September, Coldplay performed at the 2015 Global Citizen Festival in Central Park's Great Lawn in New York, an event organised by Chris Martin advocating for an end to extreme global poverty. Coldplay, along with Beyoncé, Ed Sheeran, and Pearl Jam, headlined the festival which was broadcast on NBC in the US on 27 September and the BBC in the UK on 28 September.

Speaking on Nick Grimshaw's Radio 1 Breakfast Show on the BBC on 6 November, Coldplay confirmed 4 December as the release date of  A Head Full of Dreams, and a new song from the album, "Adventure of a Lifetime" premiered on the show. The album has guest appearances from Beyoncé, Gwyneth Paltrow, Noel Gallagher, Tove Lo and Barack Obama. The album reached number one in the UK, and number two in the US, Australia and Canada among others where it was kept in second place by Adele's 25. The music video for "Adventure of a Lifetime" featured the band performing as chimpanzees. They were provided consultation with renowned performance capture actor Andy Serkis.

On 27 November 2015, the first dates to their 2016 A Head Full of Dreams Tour were announced. Latin American and European stops were listed, which included three dates at Wembley Stadium, London in June. The North America Tour, an extra Wembley concert, and an Oceania tour were later added. On 5 December, the band headlined the opening day of the 2015 Jingle Bell Ball at London's O2 Arena. On 7 February 2016 they headlined the Super Bowl 50 halftime show, being joined by Beyoncé and Bruno Mars. In April 2016, the band were named the sixth best-selling artist worldwide in 2015.

On 26 June 2016, Coldplay closed the final day of the Glastonbury Festival in England. Their performance included a duet with Barry Gibb, the last surviving member of the Bee Gees. During the band's second night at MetLife Stadium in New Jersey on 18 July, Coldplay were joined onstage by Michael J. Fox to recreate a Back to the Future scene. Martin sang "Earth Angel" before introducing Fox onstage to join the band in performing the Chuck Berry classic "Johnny B. Goode".

The band performed a full set in India for the first time as part of the Global Citizen Festival in Mumbai on 19 November 2016. This performance was attended by 80,000 people and also featured many Bollywood stars during the concert. The same month, Coldplay announced in interviews with Absolute Radio and Magic Radio in London that they would be releasing new songs in a new EP called the Kaleidoscope EP. Described as being made from a leftover "bag of ideas" from the recording of A Head Full of Dreams, Martin stated that it would be released in "a couple of months". The band officially announced that the EP was released on 14 July 2017.

On 22 February 2017, the band released a long-awaited and teased collaboration track with EDM duo The Chainsmokers called "Something Just Like This". Reaching number 2 in the UK Singles Chart and number 3 on the US Billboard Hot 100, it was the lead single from Coldplay's thirteenth extended play Kaleidoscope, released on 14 July 2017. Together, they debuted the song live at the 2017 Brit Awards with Chris Martin also performing a tribute song to the late George Michael. On 2 March, Martin's birthday, the band released a track from the EP, "Hypnotised". Two further releases from the EP, "All I Can Think About Is You" and "Aliens", came out on 15 June and 6 July 2017 respectively. On 15 August 2017, Coldplay announced that a live album covering the A Head Full of Dreams Tour would be released.

On 8 October 2017, Coldplay debuted live their new song called "Life Is Beautiful" at SDCCU Stadium in San Diego, California. It was written in support after the earthquake that affected Mexico on 19 September. Part of the band's show was broadcast at the end of Estamos Unidos Mexicanos, a benefit concert taken place at Mexico City's Zócalo, which included "Fix You", "Viva la Vida", "Adventure of a Lifetime" and their new song. Martin stated that the proceeds from the song and concert would be donated to relief efforts for Mexico and other countries.

The A Head Full of Dreams Tour was finished in November 2017. Grossing over $523 million, in 2017 it was listed as the third-highest-grossing concert tour of all time. The promised live album, which is titled Live in Buenos Aires, came out on 7 December 2018. Its footage covers the final concert of the tour in La Plata and a second release named Love in Tokyo was made available at the same time exclusively for the Japanese market. On 30 November 2018, Coldplay released Global Citizen – EP 1 under the name Los Unidades. It includes "E-Lo", a song with Pharrell Williams featuring Jozzy. Proceeds from the EP was donated towards efforts to end global poverty.

2019–2020: Everyday Life

On 26 September 2019, Global Citizen announced that Coldplay would perform at Global Goal Live: The Possible Dream on 26 September 2020. On 18 October 2019, mysterious black-and-white posters began appearing in various countries around the world, with the band in vintage-style clothing and a date showing 22 November 1919. The band also changed their profile pictures on social media to a sun and moon, making fans speculate an imminent release of new material. On 19 October 2019, a cryptic 5 second teaser was released on social media with orchestral music in the background. On 21 October 2019, in a letter sent to fans, the band announced that their eighth studio album would be titled Everyday Life and that it would be a double album, with the first half titled Sunrise and the second half titled Sunset.

On 23 October 2019, the album tracks were revealed in advertisements in the band members local newspapers in the UK, including north Wales' Daily Post (with whom Jonny Buckland once had a holiday job), and Exeter's Express & Echo (the newspaper of Chris Martin's hometown). "Orphans" and "Arabesque" were then released as the album's lead singles on 24 October 2019 on the Annie Mac show on BBC Radio 1, with the latter song being the first Coldplay song to feature profanity. The album was released on 22 November 2019 and marked by a double concert in Amman, Jordan. The concert, which streamed live to YouTube, was performed at sunrise and sunset, corresponding with the subtitles of the album's two halves.

Martin had earlier said that the band would not tour to promote the album until they could work out "how our tour can not only be sustainable (but) how can it be actively beneficial", and hope that it would be entirely carbon-neutral. However, Coldplay performed a one-off show on 25 November 2019 for the charity ClientEarth at London's Natural History Museum. The band played beneath Hope, a giant 128-year-old skeleton of a blue whale in the museum's great hall. The album debuted at number one on the UK Albums Chart with 81,000 copies sold, making it the band's eighth consecutive UK number-one album. It was also the third fastest-selling album of 2019, behind No.6 Collaborations Project and Divinely Uninspired to a Hellish Extent.  On 24 November 2020, Coldplay received two nominations for the 63rd Annual Grammy Awards, with one of them being Album of the Year, their first nomination in the category since Viva la Vida. On 21 December 2020, "Flags" was released internationally, the song was originally included as a Japanese bonus track of Everyday Life.

2021–present: Music of the Spheres

On 29 April 2021, Coldplay announced a new single called "Higher Power" to be released on 7 May 2021 with a video livestream coinciding with the release of the single to be aired from the International Space Station. Chris Martin stated in an interview with Zane Lowe that the band would be working with Max Martin and his team on both the song and the new album. He said, "Max is our producer right now for everything we do". On 4 May 2021, Coldplay were announced as the opening act for the 2021 Brit Awards, where they would be performing "Higher Power".

On 22 May 2021, their pre-recorded performance at Glastonbury Festival was broadcast online. The band also showcased a new song called "Human Heart", featuring R&B duo We Are King. On 8 June 2021, the "official" music video for "Higher Power", directed by Dave Meyers, premiered on YouTube, following a simpler music video featuring the band performing the song while dancing with CGI alien holograms that premiered on 7 May 2021. On 20 July 2021, Coldplay announced that their new album Music of the Spheres would be released on 15 October 2021, and also announced a track titled "Coloratura", which was released 23 July 2021.

On 13 September 2021, they announced with South Korean pop group BTS the second single, "My Universe", which was released on 24 September 2021. The song debuted at number 3 on the UK Singles Chart, being their highest-peaking single since "Something Just Like This" and debuted at number one on the US Billboard Hot 100. A short documentary about the collaboration with BTS was later released on 26 September 2021 on the official BTS YouTube channel.

Music of the Spheres debuted at number one the UK Albums Chart, becoming the fastest-selling album in the country since Ed Sheeran's 2019 No.6 Collaborations Project. The album debuted at number four on the US Billboard 200 chart, and reached number one on both the Top Alternative Albums and the Top Rock Albums charts. On 14 October 2021, Coldplay announced their eighth concert tour, the Music of the Spheres World Tour, which began in San José, Costa Rica, in March 2022 and will visit three continents, with more tour dates to be announced in the future. The tour is part of an ongoing effort to reduce the band's carbon footprint; Chris Martin explained in an interview with BBC that the tour would feature "kinetic flooring" that powers the concerts through the movement of concertgoers, as well as bicycles that do the same thing, meaning that "the whole show is powered from renewable energy". Martin said the band's goal is that they will have "slightly shifted the status quo of how a tour works". On 23 November 2021, "Higher Power" was nominated for Best Pop Duo/Group Performance at the 64th Annual Grammy Awards. In December 2021, Martin said Coldplay would release three more albums until 2025 during an interview for BBC, with one of them being "kind of a musical" while their last will be a "back to the basics" self-titled record. He added, however, that the band will still be active with smaller releases and worldwide touring after 2025. On 23 February 2022, the band released a new stripped-down version of "Let Somebody Go", and a cover of Kid Cudi's 2008 single "Day 'n' Nite". Both songs were part of their Spotify Singles release. The album received three nominations at the 65th Annual Grammy Awards announced on 15 November 2022, including Album of the Year and Best Pop Vocal Album, with "My Universe" being nominated for Best Pop Duo/Group Performance.

Artistry

Creative process

During an interview for NME, Berryman explained the band usually have a title and concept in mind before the music arrives, which serves to provide a "framework into which we can work thematically". Martin described their way of making songs as "a series of doors", since he brings initial ideas to Buckland, the guitarist either disapproves or gives his input on them, and the same happens from Buckland to Berryman and then Champion, allowing each band member to express themselves artistically. However, this process is not always linear, as tracks like "Magic" and "Adventure of a Lifetime" were started through the bass and guitar riffs from Berryman and Buckland respectively. When asked about avoiding the use of explicit language in lyrics, Champion stated "sometimes there are more elegant ways of saying something", and "swear words are extremely useful at times", but "if you overuse them it lessens their impact".

Critics have also noticed a pattern by which the band alternated "between overt bids for mainstream success and more self-consciously artsy prestige pieces". Explaining it, Buckland said "Knowing that the big [album] is coming allows us to go a lot smaller" and "be much more insular about what music we make sense". They have used different aesthetics for the promotion of each record as well, with James Hall from The Telegraph citing how over the years Coldplay's look "has morphed from skinny indie kids (Parachutes) to chorus members of Les Misérables (Viva la Vida or Death and All His Friends)" to "a sepia-tinged 1919 jazz band (Everyday Life)". After being questioned about the black clothes used while X&Y (2005) was promoted, Martin further added "There's great security in looking over at [Buckland] and seeing he's wearing the same coloured shoes as me. I suppose it's the same reason why the army wears a uniform, so that you feel part of a clan. And when we are all dressed that way, I just feel very much like [everything] is OK, because I am part of this team".

Musical and lyrical style
Coldplay have explored many musical styles throughout their career, with their sound being considered alternative rock, alternative pop, pop rock, post-Britpop, soft rock, and pop. After winning a Grammy Award for Best Rock Album in 2009, Martin jokingly stated in his acceptance speech that they were "limestone rock", in comparison to "hard rock". The extended plays released in 1998 and 1999 have characteristics of dream pop, setting them apart from future releases. Their first studio album, Parachutes (2000), was described as "melodic pop" which combined "bits of distorted guitar riffs and swishing percussion", being "exquisitely dark and artistically abrasive". Berryman called it "a quiet, polite record", while Champion compared the lyrics to Lou Reed's "Perfect Day", as they are "quite moody" but with "twists that imply optimism", ultimately creating an album defined by the contrast between "beautiful and happy" messages and "really, really sad" sounds.

On the other hand, 2002's A Rush of Blood to the Head is full of "plaintive strums, weary arpeggios and pained melodies", along with a sense of urgency and heartbreak. During an interview, Martin stated the record's title means "doing something on impulse". Critics described it as larger, darker, and colder than its predecessor, praising Coldplay for showing a "newfound confidence" as well. This style was kept for their third album, X&Y (2005), although with the addition of electronic influences and extensive use of synthesizers, having a grander scale in terms of both sound and existential themes. Craig McLean from The Guardian called it "the work of an increasingly driven, punchier band", describing the melodies as "heartfelt stuff, with thumping guitar lines and emotive piano". Lyrics from the record have been considered "ruminations on Martin's doubts, fears, hopes, and loves", with words that "are earnest and vague, so listeners can identify with the underlying concepts in the songs". Kevin Devine from Hybrid Magazine wrote that Buckland's "gleaming guitar sound gives X&Y a euphonic radiance", and thematically, the album contains a "running thread of importance of trying, as well as the need for basic communication amongst the cacophony of confusion in the world".

With Viva la Vida or Death and All His Friends and the subsequent Prospekt's March (both released in 2008), Coldplay further diversified their style and explored new territory following the completion of what they saw as a trilogy of albums. The band experimented with many different instruments, including electric violins, tack pianos, santoors and orchestras, all while using more layered productions. They also tried distinct song structures and vocal identities at the suggestion of producer Brian Eno, drawing influences from oriental, Hispanic, African, and Middle Eastern sounds. The title track, "Viva la Vida", is considered baroque pop and fourth single "Strawberry Swing" was described as having  psychedelic inspirations. They dabbled in shoegaze on hidden track "Chinese Sleep Chant" as well. Lyrics are more universal in comparison to previous material, with the subject matter being more collective as the band "delves into love, life, war and death". Martin commented the revolution motifs were inspired by Victor Hugo's novel Les Misérables (1862).

Those themes, along with some of the oriental influences, remained in 2011's Mylo Xyloto, a concept album that follows the story of two characters in the style of a rock opera. It expanded the spectrum of Coldplay's sound by including more electronic elements than before and featuring mostly upbeat tones for the first time, resulting in a pop rock style with "modern, urban and dance" melodies. According to Champion, the band originally wanted to make an acoustic record, so when "Paradise" started to take shape, they decided to begin a separate electronic album. However, the two of them ultimately became a single body of work, with songs like "Charlie Brown" and "Us Against the World" getting reworked into their current versions. Berryman affirmed they approached the project with "a lot of confidence". Lyrically, Martin said he was inspired by old school American graffiti, the White Rose movement, and "being able to speak out or follow your passion, even if everybody seems against it". In 2013, a comic book based on the record's plot was released in partnership with Mark Osborne.

For Ghost Stories (2014), Coldplay adopted a melancholic and somber style considered reminiscent of their debut, while incorporating electronica, R&B, synth-pop and ambient influences. Its melodies are also noticeably darker and more minimalistic than Mylo Xyloto, having sparse arrangements that reflect their desire to "keep a sense of space" without "being afraid of silence" or "layering too many sounds". The project is considered a break-up album as well, exploring lyrically how past events in one's life (their ghosts) affect the present. Martin called it a "journey of learning about unconditional love" after his divorce from Gwyneth Paltrow. A year later, A Head Full of Dreams was released with a similar style, but featuring bright and uplifting tones instead, making contrast with its predecessor while introducing elements of disco and funk, most notably in the single "Adventure of a Lifetime". In the lyrics, they worked on subjects of unity, dreaming, parenthood, forgiveness, healing, and thankfulness.

In 2017, the band made Kaleidoscope EP available as a companion piece to the album. It included a live version of "Something Just Like This", their EDM collaboration with the Chainsmokers, and Brian Eno's returning production in "Aliens". Meanwhile, tracks such as "All I Can Think About Is You" and "Hypnotised" mixed Coldplay's newfound pop style with their alternative rock roots, setting the template for Everyday Life (2019), which saw a return to the experimentation and organic sounds of Viva la Vida or Death and All His Friends while having new influences from gospel, blues and classical music. Released as the lead single along with "Orphans", the song "Arabesque" drew from jazz fusion and afrobeat inspirations. The band continued their lyrical themes of positivity, equality, hope, legacy and humanity, but added loss, pain and commentaries on political and social issues such as racism, police brutality, gun control and refugee crisis, being their first album with profanity.

This multi-style approach was similarly present in 2021's Music of the Spheres, although leaning towards pop sounds. According to Berryman, the album "was created with one eye on the live performances" and that "shaped the overall energy levels and song selections" for it. Martin added he was inspired by the Star Wars franchise, which made him wonder what other artists could be like across the universe after watching the Mos Eisley Cantina band perform. New musical influences include "Human Heart" and "Coloratura"; the former is an a cappella collaboration with R&B duo We Are King and Jacob Collier, while the latter is a progressive rock ballad running at 10 minutes and 18 seconds, making it the longest song the band have released. The phrase "Everyone is an alien somewhere" was frequently used to promote the project, Champion stated it is meant to get people to look at what brings them together instead of what keeps them apart, since "from another planet's perspective, we would be the aliens".

Influences

Coldplay's music has been compared with A-ha, U2, Oasis, R.E.M. and Radiohead. They acknowledge Scottish band Travis and American singer Jeff Buckley as major influences on their early material as well, which was mostly produced by Ken Nelson. Martin is known to be a fan of Bruce Springsteen, mentioned "spending three years trying to sound like Eddie Vedder" before Buckley, and commented listening to many hymns when he was young due to his religious upbringing. In 2021, he cited Belgian singer-songwriter Stromae as another influence, affirming "He is one of our heroes you know, he is one of those people that comes along and completely inspires you all over again".

Buckland, on the other hand, stated the Stone Roses were one of the reasons why he learned to play guitar. In 2020, he shared on social media playlists with some of his favorite tracks and artists from each decade, including the Velvet Underground, Carole King, Joy Division, Talking Heads, Kate Bush, Donna Summer, Björk, Beastie Boys and many others. He said during an interview in the following year his favorite song of all time is "Teardrop" by Massive Attack. Meanwhile, Berryman is known to be inspired by artists like James Brown, Marvin Gaye, Kool & the Gang and the Funk Brothers. He further added that his musical taste is "hard to condense it down" but "could not live without the Beatles or Motown". As for Champion, he commented knowing how to play violin and piano since he was eight years old gave him a different perspective on drums, which he only learned to play after joining the band. During his youth, he listened to Bob Dylan, Tom Waits, Nick Cave and traditional Irish folk music. He has named Ginger Baker, Dave Grohl and John Bonham as some of his favorite drummers.

For A Rush of Blood to the Head (2002), they drew inspiration from Echo & the Bunnymen, George Harrison, and Muse. Their third album, X&Y (2005), was particularly influenced by Kraftwerk, Depeche Mode and Johnny Cash. The song "Til Kingdom Come" was originally written as a collaboration with the latter before he died. Aside from Nelson, the band also worked with Danton Supple in the recording sessions. In 2008's Viva la Vida or Death and All His Friends, Coldplay's style moved towards art rock, being inspired by My Bloody Valentine, Blur and Arcade Fire. After partnering with Brian Eno and Jon Hopkins, they began to incorporate elements of ambient music and electronica into their compositions. The two producers returned in Mylo Xyloto (2011), with the former having a more direct role by helping to write the songs.

In 2014, Paul Epworth contributed for Ghost Stories. Producers Tim Bergling and Madeon were involved as well, which resulted in tracks like "A Sky Full of Stars" having a more "danceable flavor". Made available in the following year, A Head Full of Dreams (2015) featured producing duo Stargate. Long-time partners of the band include Davide Rossi, Bill Rakho, Rik Simpson and Dan Green. The last three are referred as "The Dream Team" on Everyday Life (2019) and all four have been working with Coldplay since Viva la Vida or Death and All His Friends. For their ninth album, Music of the Spheres (2021), the group invited Swedish producer Max Martin. The song "People of the Pride" has an introduction inspired by a Beyoncé performance at the Global Citizen Festival, while promotional single "Coloratura" drew comparisons to Pink Floyd.

Live performances

Coldplay are known to "make sure each tour is its own dazzling, light-up spectacular", with their visual shows making use of lasers, fireworks, confetti cannons and interactive LED wristbands. The latter is considered a signature piece of their performances as the band is credited with popularizing its use. When reviewing Live in Buenos Aires (2018), Sam Sodomsky from Pitchfork stated that it "makes a strong case for the legacy of one of the 21st century's most enduring live acts", a perspective echoed by The Guardian Alexis Petridis after describing the band's setlists as "a bullish reminder of how [they] got, and then stayed, huge". Both reviewers also commented on how Martin often interacts with the public between each song's performance.

For Ghost Stories Tour, however, they performed intimate sets at venues such as Royal Albert Hall and the Beacon Theatre. The concerts made use of new features including a laser harp and the reactable. A similar approach was taken for Everyday Life (2019) over their environmental concerns, with the band playing small shows for charity and a special livestream at the Amman Citadel in Jordan. When reviewing the latter, Dan Stubbs from NME concluded "on stage is where Coldplay come alive, and where they make the most sense". In 2022, Champion said the Flaming Lips were instrumental in shaping their idea of how entertaining a concert can be, as the American band's tours have "a sense of wonder and sense of fun which we really respond to".

Public image
Coldplay are considered polarizing pop/rock icons, having received both praise and criticism from music reviewers as well as the public. They maintain a close relationship with fans through videos, letters and social media interactions, becoming the third- and sixth-most-followed band in the world on Twitter and Instagram, respectively. They are also known to tease upcoming releases by spreading easter eggs and clues around the world. In a survey published by the Daily Mirror listing the most popular and unpopular artists in the United Kingdom, Coldplay were among the 20 most-voted acts on both lists; the only other bands with the same distinction were ABBA and U2. In July 2000, Alan McGee described their songs as "bedwetters music", to which Buckland responded: "We are trying to be who we are, you know. Pretending to be 'a bit mad' would just be sad". McGee apologized for the comment two decades later, saying, "I don't like their music but I don't think they are that bad".

Jon Pareles from The New York Times named Coldplay "the most insufferable band of the decade", defining X&Y (2005) as "faultless to a fault, with instrumental tracks purged of any glimmer of human frailty". In 2015, Idolator Carl Williott compared it to the works of Phil Collins, noting "such perfectionism is always considered corny in its time", but have cachet in subsequent eras "because the production values, songcraft and sheer talent stood the test of time". They were accused of "sticking to a formula" as well, to which some critics have argued that even though Coldplay "never totally break out from the conventions of a genre", they do "travel" between them. Furthermore, while writing for The Guardian, Ben Beaumont-Thomas affirmed that "from genre-spanning albums to collaborating with Brian Eno and Beyoncé, they are far more radical than people give them credit for", a sentiment echoed by NME Charlotte Krol while reviewing Everyday Life (2019).

Steven Hyden from Uproxx stated Coldplay "will always be an irresistible target for a certain kind of person" because "they epitomize mainstream pop rock more than any other act from the past twenty years", adding "mainstream bands are the easiest music entities to mock" and how "it is presumed that there is nothing to 'get' with this band", but "if that was actually true, they wouldn't be so polarizing". Similarly, The Independent commented they are "often positive, distinctly uncontroversial and inoffensive" while "in the modern world (especially online), if you're not causing outrage you may as well not exist". In a special editorial named "25 Songs That Tell Us Where Music Is Going", The New York Times selected "Hymn for the Weekend" and concluded that Coldplay's "brand of wide-screen pop attracts easy put-downs" such as "edgeless" and "corny", but "like Phil Collins, Michael McDonald, ABBA or any number of desperately 'unhip' artists, their image will evaporate while their songs will weather the years", as the band "is built to endure".

Legacy

Accolades and achievements

Coldplay are considered the most successful band of the 21st century. With over 100 million albums sold globally, they are one of the best-selling artists of all time. Parachutes (2000), A Rush of Blood to the Head (2002) and X&Y (2005) have all been listed among the 50 best-selling albums of United Kingdom's history, marking the most appearances by a group in the ranking. The latter was the third-fastest-selling record ever in the country upon release. In 2008, "Viva la Vida" became the first British group song to top both UK Singles Chart and Billboard Hot 100 since "Wannabe" by the Spice Girls. Its parent album, Viva la Vida or Death and All His Friends, was the best-selling of the decade in digital download formats. In 2013, Coldplay were named the most influential British celebrities in the world by Forbes. The following year saw them become the first band in history to surpass one billion streams on Spotify. Their performance at the Super Bowl 50 halftime show in 2016 earned the biggest audience ever for a group and male act, with the event's impact making them the year's most googled band. In November 2017, they finished the A Head Full of Dreams Tour, which is currently the seventh-highest-grossing tour of all time. Coldplay then headlined the Glastonbury Festival for a record-extending fifth time in 2021. During the same year, "My Universe" became the first song by a British group to ever debut at number one on Billboard Hot 100. In 2022, their touring gross surpassed $1 billion from 12 million tickets sold in 456 reported shows, making them the fifth band in history achieve the feat, following Bon Jovi, Eagles, The Rolling Stones and U2.

The band have received numerous accolades throughout their career as well, becoming the most awarded and nominated group of all time at the Brit Awards (nine victories from 30 nominations). They are the first act in history to win British Album of the Year thrice and British Group four times, scoring the most nominations for both categories. Coldplay have also won seven Grammy Awards from 39 nominations, receiving Song of the Year and Record of the Year once, while being nominated for the Album of the Year category three times. In January 2009, they received a NRJ Award of Honour in recognition of their career accomplishments and impact. The band were then named Songwriters of the Year at the ASCAP London Music Awards in the following year, having previously received the same honor from the Ivor Novello Awards in 2003. Their single "Atlas", which was released as part of The Hunger Games: Catching Fire (2013) soundtrack, was nominated for the 19th Critics' Choice Awards and shortlisted at the 87th Academy Awards. In 2014, Coldplay were ranked as the sixth most awarded group of all time by Fuse. Two years later, the band were chosen for NME Awards' Godlike Genius Award, which honours "careers of music icons who have been pioneers in the industry". They have won two American Music Awards, seven Billboard Music Awards, seven MTV Video Music Awards, three Juno Awards, two silver prizes at the Cannes Lions International Festival of Creativity and established 10 Guinness World Records, currently holding six of them. In May 2022, it was reported the band's estimated combined wealth (without Harvey) has surpassed £471 million.

Impact on music

According to Steve Baltin from Forbes, Coldplay have become the standard for the current alternative music scene and "through consistent performing and adventuresome work" continue to grow "into one of the finest live bands in all of music". Writing for Afisha, Sergey Stepanov affirmed they inherited U2's ability to "make alternative rock mainstream" and are "the Beatles of the 21st century" in terms of "hit-making abilities and potential heft". In the Recording Academy's 20th anniversary review of Parachutes (2000), Jon O'Brien commented the album "ushered in a new wave of mild-mannered guitar bands" and "helped to open the floodgates for those who didn't subscribe to the Rock N' Roll Star way of thinking", impacting the work of groups such as the Fray, Snow Patrol and OneRepublic as well. Their breakthrough single, "Yellow", is considered one of the best tracks of the 2000s decade by Pitchfork and became part of the Rock and Roll Hall of Fame's "Songs That Shaped Rock and Roll" exhibition for being one of the most successful and important recordings in the music industry. When discussing key events in the history of rock, The Guardian commented Coldplay set the genre's direction for years to come with the song and brought a "fresh timbre of songwriting: yearning melancholy, buoyed by a sense of uplift".

Their second album, A Rush of Blood to the Head (2002), was chosen by the Royal Mail for a set of stamps which celebrated classic British album covers from the last 40 years, being also ranked as one of the best albums of all time by the Rock and Roll Hall of Fame, NME, and Rolling Stone. The latter magazine placed "Clocks" and "Fix You" at number 490 and 392, respectively, on their list of "The 500 Greatest Songs of All Time". In 2010, Coldplay were included in VH1's "100 Greatest Artists of All Time" special, which recognized music artists based on a poll of music industry experts. The subsequent year saw the band release Mylo Xyloto, which was added to Q "Greatest Albums of the Last 30 Years" editorial. Similarly, Rolling Stone ranked "Every Teardrop Is a Waterfall" among the best tracks of the 2010s decade, while "A Sky Full of Stars" was named one of the period's defining alternative rock songs by iHeartRadio. The band are credited with boosting British music global exports by the British Phonographic Industry (BPI) alongside Adele and Ed Sheeran as well, with 2016 and 2020 being the years of most notable contribution.

Meanwhile, Firstpost Lakshmi Govindrajan Javeri stated Coldplay have "mastered the art of reinvention" and consequently widened "the roster of artists inspired by them", which resulted in the creation of "a rich multi-genre legacy". Furthermore, they are considered one of the most influential bands of the 21st century, impacting the work of acts such as Imagine Dragons, Halsey, the Killers, Avril Lavigne, Dua Lipa, Bruno Mars, Rammstein, Ed Sheeran, Harry Styles, Kanye West, and many others. In 2014, Bono commented they were among the major influences for U2's thirteenth album, Songs of Innocence. Swedish producer and arranger Mattias Bylund explained he made "Coldplay-type rhythm chords" for Taylor Swift's "Wildest Dreams". American musician Finneas O'Connel cited the band as an inspiration for both his career and the production of Billie Eilish's debut album, When We All Fall Asleep, Where Do We Go? (2019). South Korean music director Lee Ji-soo affirmed "Life in Technicolor II" was one of the songs which had an impact on the soundtrack for In Our Prime (2022). Writing for G1, Carol Prado mentioned they helped to reshape sertanejo music in Brazil, given how various notable acts from the genre (including Luan Santana and Victor & Leo) took inspiration in the band's use of "elongated syllables" and melodies which slowly "build up to strong choruses". Their music have been sampled in numerous occasions, including by Drake, Lizzo, Frank Ocean, and Chance the Rapper, while also being covered by singers like Kelly Clarkson, Kacey Musgraves, Robyn, Rosé, and Sam Smith.

Influence on live entertainment
Felipe Branco Cruz from Veja stated Coldplay "reinvented the concept of arena rock", as their live performances turned fans into the show's protagonists instead of mere spectators, consequently carrying on the legacy of spectacles "which transcend music" that was established by groups such as Pink Floyd, Queen and U2. The band are widely credited with popularizing the use of interactive LED wristbands in concerts as well. Acts who followed their trend include Lady Gaga, Taylor Swift, OneRepublic, the Weeknd, and Jay-Z. Jason Regler, the product's creator, said his idea was conceived during a Coldplay show. According to Didier Zacharie from Le Soir, the ecological plan proposed by the Music of the Spheres World Tour (2022–23) was "unprecedented" for a stadium tour, leading the band to be credited with "laying down the blueprints" for environmentally friendly touring. In 2022, Live Nation's Lucy August-Perna commented they helped to further build on the framework the company had been developing during the previous five years and their best practices and plans will be standardized to "provide sustainable touring options" for more artists. Uproxx and Billboard recognized Coldplay's impact on Billie Eilish's Happier Than Ever, The World Tour and Shawn Mendes' Wonder: The World Tour, respectively. Their work in partnership with John Wiseman (from Worldwide Sales) and Frederic Opsomer (from PRG Projects) for the stage's LED elements resulted in the creation of products "that never existed before", such as inflatable three-dimensional orbs which "dramatically" reduced the necessary space to store and transport regular models. Opsomer also said the custom technology developed for the tour will become "commonplace in a few years" in the live entertainment industry, thanking the band for "having the vision and backbone" of the endeavour.

Other activities

Philanthropy
Coldplay donates 10 percent from all of their profits to charity. The fund is held in a bank account none of the members can access. The band currently endorses over thirty organizations, including Amnesty International, Migrant Offshore Aid Station and Global Citizen Festival. They have been vocal about fair trade, supporting Oxfam's Make Trade Fair campaign by collecting over 70,000 signatures for their "Big Noise" petition at A Rush of Blood to the Head Tour and Twisted Logic Tour. In 2005, they partnered with the Make Poverty History movement and appeared on their campaigns. Coldplay also auctioned many significant memorabilia in 2009 for Kids Company, including Martin's first guitar, the globe from the Parachutes (2000) album cover and the costumes worn during Viva la Vida Tour. In the following year, they became patrons for ClientEarth.

The band performed a slightly modified version of "A Message", entitled "A Message 2010", at the Hope For Haiti Now telethon special, raising money for the victims of the 2010 Haiti earthquake. Berryman commented that "You can make people aware of issues. It isn't very much effort for us at all, if it can help people, then we want to do it". In 2012, Album Artists staged an exhibition made up of artwork from Mylo Xyloto (2011) in Camden, it raised over £610,000 for Kids Company. Two years later, Martin joined charity group Band Aid for a second time, performing alongside British and Irish acts on a new version of "Do They Know It's Christmas?" that raised money for the Ebola crisis in Western Africa. In July 2017, the band made a donation of undisclosed value for University of Southampton's Centre for Cancer Immunology, which is the United Kingdom's first centre dedicated to cancer immunology research.

Coldplay have also contributed to the Plastic Oceans Album by Artists' Project Earth, the record was released on 20 February 2018 at the Ocean Plastics Crisis Summit in London, raising awareness and funds to counter plastic pollution. Under the pseudonym Los Unidades, the band made Global Citizen – EP 1 available on the same year, with royalties being directed to the organization's efforts of education and advocacy towards the end of extreme poverty. In 2020, they released a music video for "Trouble In Town", inspired by George Orwell's Animal Farm (1944), and donated all proceeds from streaming and publishing to the Innocence Project and the African Children's Feeding Scheme. Coldplay declared support to the Ocean Cleanup project as well, sponsoring two watercrafts that collect plastic from polluted rivers before it reaches the sea in Malaysia. As part of the band's efforts to make touring more sustainable, they announced a partnership with One Tree Planted, funding a tree for every ticket sold at Music of the Spheres World Tour through a global reforestation agreement. According to a report published by The Times, they donated over £2.1 million to environmental causes through their J Van Mars Foundation during 2021.

Politics and activism

Martin, who lives in the United States, spoke out against the 2003 invasion of Iraq led by country along with other military forces during a Teenage Cancer Trust concert at London's Royal Albert Hall, encouraging the sold-out venue's crowd to "sing against war". He also showed support for Democratic presidential candidates John Kerry in 2004, and Barack Obama in 2008. One year later, the band started to take part in Meat Free Mondays, a food campaign started by Paul McCartney which attempts to help slow climate change by having at least one meat free day a week. In 2011, Coldplay endorsed the song "Freedom for Palestine" by posting a link to the music video on their social media, they received over 12,000 comments in less than day, with fans either agreeing or disagreeing with the message. Some threatened to boycott them and created a group that demanded an apology to Israel. Eventually the post was deleted from their pages, however, Frank Barat of OneWorld stated it was actually removed by Facebook after "thousands of people and computer generated posts reported it as abusive", rather than the band's management.

Coldplay have advocated for the LGBTQ community as well, sparking controversy with their performance at the Super Bowl 50 halftime show. The band were accused of promoting the "gay agenda" by conservatives for the show's last moment, where the audience flipped over rainbow-coloured placards that read "Believe in Love". They are also among the artists that signed a public letter supporting the Equality Act in the United States. In June 2016, Coldplay were in favour of "Vote Remain" at the United Kingdom European Union membership referendum. Following the Brexit result, which saw 52% of the country voting to leave the European Union despite the majority of younger people voting to remain, Martin commented that "This decision does not represent us or indeed most of our generation and the generation following us". A year later, they performed at Ariana Grande's One Love Manchester benefit concert, which was organized in response to the Manchester Arena bombing and raised funds to help victims of the attack, as well as their families. Months later, they performed as special guests at the Concert for Charlottesville following the events of the Unite the Right rally. In November 2019, the band released Everyday Life, which saw them voicing more prominently their stance against racism, police brutality and gun violence.

Endorsements
Despite their worldwide popularity, Coldplay have remained notoriously protective of how their material appears in the media. The band allow songs to be used in movies and television shows regularly, but commercials are limited to very rare occasions. In 2002, it was reported they turned down over $85 million in contracts from companies such as Gatorade, Diet Coke and Gap. Martin said "We would not be able to live with ourselves if we sold the songs' meanings like that". The first instance one of their songs were used for advertisements was with "Viva la Vida" in 2008, the band signed a deal with Apple and promoted the single's exclusive availability on iTunes. In 2010, Martin appeared at the company's September event. After the death of Steve Jobs, Coldplay performed four tracks at the Apple Campus, posthumously thanking his support.

Six years later, they took part in a Target commercial which promoted the exclusive deluxe edition of Ghost Stories (2014). Meanwhile, the music video for "Adventure of a Lifetime", which was directed by Mat Whitecross and recorded at The Imaginarium, had a Beats product placement. The company was allowed to use some parts of the video on their commercials as a return for covering the budget. In 2018, director Jon M. Chu revealed he sent a letter directly to the band laying out all his reasons in order to get a permission for using "Yellow" on Crazy Rich Asians. After it was granted, a Chinese-language cover of the track was commissioned as well.

In 2021, Coldplay announced a major partnership with German multinational BMW as part of their efforts to make touring as sustainable as possible. They commented the company's technology, which includes the first recyclable car batteries in the world, is able to power live performances almost entirely from renewable energy. As part of the deal, the band contributed on the marketing of two electric cars from the company and allowed "Higher Power" to be used in advertisements. In 2022, DHL became Coldplay's freight partner for the Music of the Spheres World Tour (2022–23) due to the company's "expertise and investment in sustainable logistics" and transport solutions.

Band members
 Chris Martin – lead vocals, keyboards, piano, rhythm guitar, harmonica
 Jonny Buckland – lead guitar, backing vocals, keyboards
 Guy Berryman – bass, backing vocals, keyboards, synthesizers, percussion
 Will Champion – drums, backing vocals, keyboards, piano, percussion
 Phil Harvey – manager (1998–2002), creative director (2006–present)

Discography

 Parachutes (2000)
 A Rush of Blood to the Head (2002)
 X&Y (2005)
 Viva la Vida or Death and All His Friends (2008)
 Mylo Xyloto (2011)
 Ghost Stories (2014)
 A Head Full of Dreams (2015)
 Everyday Life (2019)
 Music of the Spheres (2021)

Filmography

 How We Saw the World (2006)
 Coldplay: A Head Full of Dreams (2018)
 Everyday Life – Live in Jordan (2019)
 Coldplay: Reimagined (2020)
 Live at River Plate (2023)

Tours

Headlining
 Parachutes Tour (2000–2001)
 A Rush of Blood to the Head Tour (2002–2003)
 Twisted Logic Tour (2005–2007)
 Viva la Vida Tour (2008–2010)
 Mylo Xyloto Tour (2011–2012)
 Ghost Stories Tour (2014)
 A Head Full of Dreams Tour (2016–2017)
 Music of the Spheres World Tour (2022–2023)

Co-headlining
 Bellatrix/Coldplay Tour (1999)
 NME Premier Tour (2000)
 Terris/Coldplay Tour (2000)

Opening act
 Muse – Showbiz Tour (2000)

See also
 List of people associated with University College London
 List of British Grammy winners and nominees
 List of best-selling music artists
 List of highest-grossing live music artists
 List of artists who reached number one on the UK Singles Chart
 List of Billboard Hot 100 number-ones by British artists

Notes

References

Further reading

External links

 Coldplay Official Website
 

 
1996 establishments in England
Musical groups established in 1996
Musical groups from London
Musical quintets
British alternative rock groups
British pop music groups
British pop rock music groups
British rock music groups
Post-Britpop groups
Atlantic Records artists
Capitol Records artists
Fierce Panda Records artists
Parlophone artists
BT Digital Music Awards winners
Brit Award winners
Grammy Award winners
Ivor Novello Award winners
Juno Award for International Album of the Year winners
MTV Europe Music Award winners
NME Awards winners
World Music Awards winners